Jackson County is a county located in the U.S. state of Tennessee. The population was 11,617 at the 2020 census. Its county seat is Gainesboro. Jackson is part of the Cookeville Micropolitan Statistical Area.

History
Jackson County was created by an act of the Tennessee General Assembly on November 6, 1801. It was the 18th county established in the state. It was formed from part of Smith County plus Indian lands. The name honors Andrew Jackson, who by 1801 had already served as a U.S. Congressman and Senator from Tennessee, a Tennessee Supreme Court justice, and a colonel in the Tennessee militia.  He became more widely known as commander at the Battle of New Orleans and as the seventh President of the United States.

Fort Blount was an important stop for travelers on Avery's Trace. Williamsburg, a town developed around the fort, served as the Jackson County seat from 1807 to 1819. The county's early records were all lost in a disastrous courthouse fire on August 14, 1872.

The 1970 Movie "I Walk The Line" starring Gregory Peck was filmed in Gainesboro and Jackson County.

Geography

Adjacent counties
Clay County (north)
Overton County (east)
Putnam County (south)
Smith County (southwest)
Macon County (northwest)

State protected areas
The Boils Wildlife Management Area
Cummins Falls State Park
Cordell Hull Wildlife Management Area (part)
Washmorgan Hollow State Natural Area

Highways

Demographics

2020 census

As of the 2020 United States census, there were 11,617 people, 4,566 households, and 2,745 families residing in the county.

2000 census
As of the census of 2000, there were 10,984 people, 4,466 households, and 3,139 families residing in the county. The population density was 36 people per square mile (14/km2). There were 5,163 housing units at an average density of 17 per square mile (6/km2).  The racial makeup of the county was 98.63% White, 0.15% Black or African American, 0.34% Native American, 0.06% Asian, 0.03% Pacific Islander, 0.12% from other races, and 0.67% from two or more races. 0.81% of the population were Hispanic or Latino of any race.

There were 4,466 households, out of which 28.80% had children under the age of 18 living with them, 55.30% were married couples living together, 10.30% had a female householder with no husband present, and 29.70% were non-families. 25.50% of all households were made up of individuals, and 10.20% had someone living alone who was 65 years of age or older. The average household size was 2.43 and the average family size was 2.89.

In the county, the population was spread out, with 22.30% under the age of 18, 7.80% from 18 to 24, 28.20% from 25 to 44, 26.80% from 45 to 64, and 15.00% who were 65 years of age or older. The median age was 40 years. For every 100 females, there were 97.80 males. For every 100 females age 18 and over, there were 94.90 males.

The median income for a household in the county was $26,502, and the median income for a family was $32,088. Males had a median income of $24,759 versus $19,511 for females. The per capita income for the county was $15,020. About 15.10% of families and 18.10% of the population were below the poverty line, including 15.10% of those under age 18 and 22.50% of those age 65 or over.

Communities

Town
Gainesboro (county seat)

Census-designated place
Dodson Branch

Unincorporated communities

Center Grove
Granville
Mayfield
Nameless
North Springs
Shady Grove
Whitleyville

Politics

As a secessionist Middle Tennessee county, Jackson County was historically one of the most Democratic in the state. Only once up to 2008 did a Democrat lose the county – when Warren G. Harding carried Jackson County by ninety votes in his record popular-vote landslide of 1920, due to large increases in voter turnout for the isolationist cause Harding espoused. Along with Lewis County it was one of two Tennessee counties to be carried by both Hubert Humphrey in 1968 and George McGovern in 1972.

However, like all of Appalachia and surrounding areas, Jackson County has since 2000 seen a very rapid shift towards the Republican Party due to opposition to the Democratic Party's liberal views on social issues. Whereas Al Gore (who grew up in nearby Smith County) won almost seventy percent of the vote in 2000, Barack Obama won by only thirty-nine votes in 2008, Mitt Romney became only the second Republican to carry the county in 2012 and Donald Trump four years later received a proportion of the vote for the GOP historically associated with Unionist East Tennessee counties.

See also
National Register of Historic Places listings in Jackson County, Tennessee

References

External links

 Official Jackson County Website
 Gainesboro-Jackson County Chamber of Commerce
 Jackson County, TNGenWeb - free genealogy resources for the county

 
1801 establishments in Tennessee
Cookeville, Tennessee micropolitan area
Populated places established in 1801
Middle Tennessee
Counties of Appalachia